Sweet Family Music: A Tribute to Stryper is a various artists album, released in 1996, as a tribute to the crossover Christian metal band Stryper.

Track listing 

 Cell Dweller - "The Abyss"
 Steve Hindalong - "To Hell with the Devil"
 Morella's Forest - "Calling On You"
 Klank - "The Way"
 Cricket ( The Huntingtons) - "Makes Me Wanna"
 Havalina Rail Co. - "Always There For You"
 Dinner Mint (Jesse Sprinkle and friends) - "All For One"
 Argyle Park - "Lonely (Two-Timing Dub)"
 Grammatrain - "More Than a Man"
 Combat Chuck - "You Know You Want To"
 Ghoti Hook - "First Love"
 Echoing Green - "You Won't Be Lonely"
 The Blamed - "Soldiers Under Command"
 Aleixa - "Makes Me Wanna..."
 Joe Christmas - "(Waiting For) A Love That's Real"
 Fluffy - "Honestly"
 Marriage is Madness - "Free"

External links
 Sweet Family Music: A Tribute to Stryper on Discogs

Stryper tribute albums
1996 compilation albums
Indie rock compilation albums
Christian rock compilation albums